Mount Weyant is a prominent ice-free summit, 1,930 m, between Loftus and Newall Glaciers in Victoria Land. Named by the Advisory Committee on Antarctic Names (US-ACAN) in 1964 for William S. Weyant, meteorologist in charge with the winter party at Little America V in 1958.

Mountains of Victoria Land
Scott Coast